The men's changquan competition at the 1998 Asian Games in Bangkok, Thailand, was held from 16-18 December at the Thammasat Gymnasium 6.

Schedule
All times are Indochina Time (UTC+07:00)

Results

References

External links
Official website

Wushu at the 1998 Asian Games